Clinton Heylin (born 8 April 1960) is an English author who has written extensively about popular music and the work of Bob Dylan.

Education 
Heylin attended Manchester Grammar School. He read history at Bedford College, University of London, followed by an MA in history at the University of Sussex.

Work 
Heylin has written extensively on the life and work of Bob Dylan, combining interviews with discographical research. His full-length biography Dylan: Behind the Shades (1991) was republished in a revised second edition as Bob Dylan: Behind the Shades – Take Two (UK edition, 2000) and Bob Dylan: Behind the Shades Revisited (US edition, 2001).

Heylin published a detailed analysis of every song by Dylan in two volumes: Revolution in the Air: The Songs of Bob Dylan: Vol. 1: 1957–73 (2009) and Still on the Road: The Songs of Bob Dylan: Vol. 2: 1974–2008 (2010). These books analyse 610 songs written by Dylan, devoting a numbered section to each song. In 2011, to mark Dylan's 70th birthday, Heylin published Behind the Shades: The 20th Anniversary Edition, which contained 60,000 words of new material to cover Dylan's work since 2000.

He has also written biographies on Van Morrison and Sandy Denny. He received favourable reviews for his studies of Orson Welles, Despite the System: Orson Welles versus the Hollywood Studios, and of Shakespeare's sonnets, So Long As Men Can Breathe.

In 2012, Heylin published a book about the theme of mental illness in British rock music in the 1960s and 1970s. Titled All the Madmen, it includes chapters on the Dialectics of Liberation conference of 1967, Syd Barrett, Pink Floyd's album The Dark Side of the Moon, David Bowie's theme of schizophrenia in his songs, the Who's Quadrophenia album, and Nick Drake.

Also in 2012, Heylin published E Street Shuffle: The Glory Days of Bruce Springsteen and the E Street Band, a biography of Bruce Springsteen and an analysis of his achievements in the recording studio.

In 2015, Heylin published It's One for the Money, a history of song publishing since the birth of the popular music industry and the establishment of song copyrights at the beginning of the twentieth century.

In 2016, Heylin published his history of UK punk music in the year 1976, Anarchy in the Year Zero: The Sex Pistols, the Clash and the Class of '76.

In October 2016, Heylin published his study of Bob Dylan's 1966 World Tour, Judas!: From Forest Hills to the Free Trade Hall: A Historical View of Dylan's Big Boo. Heylin has also contributed the liner notes for the 36-CD set, Bob Dylan: The 1966 Live Recordings, released by Sony/Legacy Recordings, which includes every known recording of Dylan’s 1966 concert tour.

In 2017, Heylin published his account of Dylan's controversial "Born Again" Christian phase, Trouble In Mind: Bob Dylan's Gospel Years: What Really Happened. The book complemented the release of The Bootleg Series Vol. 13: Trouble No More 1979–1981, which consisted of a large number of out-takes and live performances from this period of Dylan's recording and performance career.

To tie in with Dylan's 80th birthday in May 2021, Heylin published The Double Life of Bob Dylan: Volume I: 1941–1966 A Restless, Hungry Feeling. The first of two volumes, this biography is based on research by Heylin in the newly-established Bob Dylan archive in Tulsa, Oklahoma. Andrew Motion wrote in The Spectator that "Heylin has always been good on this aspect of Dylan’s story — concealment —  hence the title of his first biography, and the way this new one repeats an idea of secrecy."

Books 
 Saved! The Gospel Speeches of Bob Dylan. Hanuman Books, NY & Madras, 1990. 
 Dylan Behind the Shades. Penguin, UK; Simon & Schuster, US, 1991. 
 Bob Dylan: The Recording Sessions 1960–94. Penguin. UK; St Martin’s Press, US, 1995. 
 Dylan Day By Day: A Life in Stolen Moments. Music Sales/Schirmer, 1996. 
 Dylan's Daemon Lover: The Story of a 450-Year Old Pop Ballad. Helter Skelter, 1998. 
 Bob Dylan: Behind The Shades – Take Two. Penguin-Viking, UK, 2000. 
 No More Sad Refrains: The Life & Times of Sandy Denny. Helter Skelter, 2001. 
 Bob Dylan: Behind the Shades Revisited. Harper-Collins, US, 2001. 
 Can You Feel the Silence? – Van Morrison: A New Biography. Viking-Penguin, UK; Chicago Review Press, US, 2004. 
 Bootleg – The Rise & Fall of the Secret Recording Industry. Omnibus Press, 2004. 
 Despite the System: Orson Welles Versus the Hollywood Studios. Canongate, UK; Chicago Press Review, US, 2005. 
 All Yesterdays' Parties: The Velvet Underground in Print 1966–71. Da Capo Press, 2005. 
 From the Velvets to the Voidoids: The Birth of American Punk. Helter Skelter, UK; Chicago Review Press, US, 2005. 
 The Act You've Known For All These Years: A Year in the Life of Sgt Pepper & Friends. Canongate-Grove, US/UK, 2007. 
 Babylon's Burning: From Punk to Grunge. Penguin/ Canongate-Grove, US/UK, 2007. 
 So Long As Men Can Breathe: The Untold Story of Shakespeare's Sonnets. Perseus, US, 2009. 
 Revolution in the Air: The Songs of Bob Dylan: Vol. 1: 1957–73. Constable-Robinson, UK; Acappella, US, 2009. 
 Still on the Road: The Songs of Bob Dylan: Vol. 2: 1974–2008. Constable, UK. 2010. 
 E Street Shuffle: The Glory Days of Bruce Springsteen and the E Street Band. Constable. 2012. 
 All the Madmen: Barrett, Bowie, Drake, the Floyd, the Kinks, the Who and the Journey to the Dark Side of English Rock. Constable. 2012. 
 Behind the Shades: The 20th Anniversary Edition. Faber and Faber. 2011. 
 It's One for the Money: The Song Snatchers Who Carved Up a Century of Pop & Sparked a Musical Revolution. Constable. 2015. 
 Anarchy in the Year Zero: The Sex Pistols, The Clash and the Class of 76. Route Publishing. 2016. 
 Judas!: From Forest Hills to the Free Trade Hall: A Historical View of Dylan's Big Boo. Route Publishing. 2016. 
 Trouble in Mind: Bob Dylan's Gospel Years – What Really Happened. Lesser Gods. 2017. . Route Publishing  
 The Double Life of Bob Dylan: Volume I: 1941–1966 A Restless, Hungry Feeling. Bodley Head. 2021.

References

External links

English non-fiction writers
Living people
1960 births
Writers from Manchester